The Saving One is the fourth studio album released by Starfield on February 23, 2010.  The album was nominated in the category of Contemporary Christian/Gospel Album of the Year for the Juno Awards of 2011.

Track listing

References

2010 albums
Sparrow Records albums
Starfield (band) albums